Leopoldów may refer to the following places:
Leopoldów, Łódź Voivodeship (central Poland)
Leopoldów, Hrubieszów County in Lublin Voivodeship (east Poland)
Leopoldów, Łęczna County in Lublin Voivodeship (east Poland)
Leopoldów, Świętokrzyskie Voivodeship (south-central Poland)
Leopoldów, Białobrzegi County in Masovian Voivodeship (east-central Poland)
Leopoldów, Lipsko County in Masovian Voivodeship (east-central Poland)